The Snitch Cartel: Origins (Spanish for El Cartel de los Sapos: el origen) is a Colombian crime drama streaming television series developed for Caracol Televisión by Asier Aguilar. It is based on the book El Cartel de los Sapos by Andrés López López, and focuses specifically on the lives of the Villegas brothers, better known as Los Caballeros de Cali. The series is set in two eras, starring first Juan Pablo Urrego, and Sebastián Osorio playing the Villegas brothers in their youth, and later being replaced by Gustavo Angarita Jr., and Carlos Manuel Vega in his adulthood.

It premiered on video on demand on 28 July 2021 on Netflix.

Cast 
 Gustavo Angarita Jr. as Leonardo Villegas
 Juan Pablo Urrego as Young Leonardo
 Carlos Manuel Vesga as Emanuel Villegas
 Sebastián Osorio as Young Emanuel
 Patricia Tamayo as Marlén Ulloa
 Verónica Velásquez as Nora Villegas
 María Camila Zárate as Rosario Villareal
 Nicole Santamaría as Mayerly Salcedo
 Laura Rodríguez as Raquel Villegas
 Eduardo Pérez as Hugo de la Cruz
 Julián Farrieta as Nacho Soto Mayor
 Juan Sebastián Vega as Alfonso Torres
 Valeria Galviz as Dayana Tirado
 Susana Rojas as Deisy
 Hans Martínez as Hernando Parra
 Ernesto Benjumea as Coronel Mauricio Tirado
 Julián Bustamante as Alirio

References

External links 
 

Spanish-language Netflix original programming
2021 Colombian television series debuts
Television series set in the 16th century